Huzurkent railway station is a railway station in Huzurkent, Turkey, on the Adana-Mersin railway. The station consists of a side platform on the eastbound track. TCDD Taşımacılık operates daily regional train service from Mersin to Adana, İskenderun and İslahiye, with a total of 14 daily trains stopping at Huzurkent, in each direction.

Huzurkent station has two side platforms serving two tracks.

References

External links
TCDD Taşımacılık

Buildings and structures in Mersin
Railway stations in Mersin Province
Transport in Mersin